The American Indycar Series (AIS) was an American open wheel racing series founded in 1988 by Bill Tempero. It utilized used chassis and engines from the CART series and the Indy Racing League. CART and IRL drivers Buddy Lazier, Jaques Lazier, Robby Unser, and Johnny Unser found success in the AIS.

The series was reborn with new management in 2001-2002. A new management team formed United States Speedway Series (USSS), while a new AIS under different management conducted races as well. The USSS ceased racing after 2005; the AIS shut down after 2002.

Over the years, the series had a predominantly western-based schedule.

History
In the mid-1980s, the once-popular Can Am series was withering, and most teams had already defected to CART or IMSA. The last holdouts formed CAT (Can-Am Teams) in 1986 to take over sanctioning as part of the SCCA.

Two plans emerged, one keeping the Formula 5000-based cars, and others who favored using old CART machines. Bill Tempero led the Indy-style effort. CAT held one race in 1986, and folded after a short 1987 season. Tempero broke off and started his Indy car series in 1988, with the cars powered by 5.9-litre stock block Chevrolet engines.

As the series began to slowly gain competitors, the teams were allowed to run a choice of two powerplants. The aforementioned V-8 5.9-liter Chevy stockblock, or a V-6 (best known as the Buick/Menard) in turbocharged or normally aspirated configuration. An equivalency formula was determined to provide for competitive balance amongst the different engine combinations.

The chassis used were used March, Lola, Reynard, Eagle, and Penske from CART competition. In later years, G-Force and Dallara cars from IRL competition were also used.

Champions

American IndyCar Series
1988 Buddy Lazier
1989 Robby Unser
1990 Bill Tempero
1991 Bill Tempero
1992 Rod Bennett
1993 Rick Sutherland
1994 Bill Tempero
1995 Bill Tempero
1996 Ken Petrie
1997 Ken Petrie
1998 Greg Gorden
1999 Bill Tempero
2000 Mike Lee
2002 Eddie Nahir (ARS)

United States Speedway Series
2001 Ken Petrie
2002 Ken Petrie
2003 Mike Koss
2004 Greg Gorden
2005 Bailey Dotson

AIS Seasons

1986-1987 CAT season

For 1987, Indy car events were organized through CAT (Can Am Teams).

1988 season

The first full season of AIS took place in 1988. The season concluded with twin races at Willow Springs. Buddy Lazier won the first season championship, with Robby Unser second.

1989 season
June 4 I-70 Speedway, Robby Unser (2 wins) 
June 11 Memphis Motorsports Park Robby Unser  (2 wins)
July 4 Colorado National Speedway Robby Unser,  Buddy Lazier 
September 30 Tioga Robby Unser,  Richard Griffin  
October 29 Willow Springs Buddy Lazier,  Robby Unser

1990-1995 seasons

1998 season

1999 season

2000 season

2002 ARS 
April 20–21 Las Vegas Motor Speedway Las Vegas Valley|Las Vegas, Nevada (Eddy Nahir)
May 18–19 Thunderhill Motorsport Park
June 21–23 California Speedway, two races, (Eddy Nahir, Eddy Nahir)
Oct. 5 - 6 Willow Springs International Raceway
Nov. 22 - 24 Phoenix International Raceway
Dec. 13 - 15 Aloha Grand Prix

USSS seasons

2001 season

2002 season

2003 season

References

External links
ChampCarStats.com
Motorsport.com - Open wheel racing

Formula racing series
Auto racing series in the United States
Recurring sporting events established in 1989